Mawkanin (also known as Ta Maw Kanin) is a large village in Ye Township in Mawlamyine District in the Mon State of southern Myanmar.

Geography
Mawkanin is located in the coastal plain and surrounded by Maw Ka Nin River along the north side.

Populations
According to the Myanmar Census 2014 report, the population in Mawkanin is 17,552 which are 8,403 males and 9,149 females.

Transport

Mawkanin lies on the National Highway 8 (Myanmar) which is connecting Thaton, Mawlamyine, Dawei, and Myeik and lt joins AH1 at Thaton.

Education

Mawkanin has four secondary schools and five primary schools.
 No.1 Basic Education High School(MawKanin)
 No.2 Basic Education High School(MawKanin)
 No.3 Basic Education High School(MawKanin)
 Mon National Middle School(MawKanin)
 No.4 Basic Education primary School(MawKanin)
 Basic Education primary School(WaeTone)
 Basic Education primary School(KawZwe)
 Basic Education primary School(KawLaTwae)
 Basic Education primary School(YwaTarYar)

Places to visit
Mawkanin Pagoda is unique architecture and quite different from other pagoda statues usually seen around the country, and easy to access other towns and villages nearby and in Ye town from Mawkanin. The most popular places around the Mawkanin are Lamaing (Kyaik kay La Tha pagoda), Kyaik Dat Maw Brat (Poppawadi Village), Kawdut(Gwan stone beach), Kyaung Ywa Two Creek Resort, Ye Town, and Ka Byar Wa Beach.

Climate
Mawkanin has a tropical monsoon climate (Köppen climate classification Am). Temperatures are hot throughout the year, although maximum temperatures in the monsoon months are depressed by heavy clouds and rain. There is a winter dry season (November–April) and a summer wet season (May–October). Torrential rain falls from June to September, with over  falling in August alone.

Gallery

Notable Person
 Luangpho Uttama :First Mon Monk in Thailand who fled to Thailand in 1948, avoiding abuse during the civil war in Burma.

Notes

External links
 "Mawkanin Map — Satellite Images of Mawkanin" Maplandia World Gazetteer

Populated places in Mon State